The Moranbong Theatre is a theatre located in Moranbong, Pyongyang, North Korea. It was opened in 1946 and renovated in 2006.

See also 

 List of theatres in North Korea
 State Symphony Orchestra of the Democratic People's Republic of Korea

References

External links 
Moranbong Theatre picture album at Naenara

Theatres in North Korea
Theatres completed in 1946
1946 establishments in North Korea
Buildings and structures in Pyongyang